Qeshlaq-e Qarah Zagheh (also Romanized as Qeshlāq-e Qarah Zāgheh) is a village in Hakimabad Rural District, in the Central District of Zarandieh County, Markazi Province, Iran. At the 2006 census, its population was 44, in 13 families.

References 

Populated places in Zarandieh County